Deepfield (often stylized as deepfield) are an American rock band from Charleston, South Carolina, consisting of members Baxter Teal III, Jake Portenkirchner, Ken Becker and PJ Farley. They have released three albums and one EP.

The band is currently based in Chicago, Illinois.

History

Formation
Deepfield was formed in Charleston, SC in 2005 by Baxter Teal, Eric Bass (now the bassist for Shinedown), Russell Lee (drums) and J. King (original bass player, moved over to guitar when Bass left the band to pursue producing and recording). The band's name came from the image of space taken by the Hubble telescope in 1995. After shopping a three-song demo the band found themselves playing a showcase in New York, where they were promptly signed by industry legend Bill McGathy to his new label, In De Goot Recordings.

After being signed to In De Goot Records (Fontana/Universal) in 2006 and spending more than a year writing, the band took over 70 demos into the studio with producers Paul Ebersold and Skidd Mills (3 Doors Down, Saliva, Third Day, Skillet, Saving Abel), before releasing the 12 songs on their debut record, Archetypes and Repetition (2007).

Aron Robinson joined the band on the 2008 Cage Rattle Most Wanted Tour. PJ Farley joined the group in 2009 and is also the bassist for the rock band Ra (Universal). Sean Von Tersch joined the group in 2010.

Archetypes and Repetition

The band released their debut record Archetypes and Repetition (Indegoot/Fontana/Universal) in 2007, touring the country extensively from 2007 to 2009 behind the singles "Get It" and "Into the Flood", the latter garnering "#1 phones" in several U.S. markets. Both singles are still in rotation on XM and Sirius Satellite radio and Get It can often be heard as the intro music to The Howard Stern Show.

"Don't Let Go", a cover of the En Vogue original was never officially released yet still garnered radio play.

Deepfield supported the record on the road with Shinedown, Puddle of Mudd, Saliva, Chevelle, Saving Abel, Drowning Pool, Tantric, Nonpoint and The Exies.

Nothing Can Save Us Now

Nothing Can Save Us Now is Deepfield's sophomore effort, released December 6, 2011 through Skiddco Music label. The first single on the new album is the song "Nothing Left to Lose".

Return
After disbanding in 2011, the band has returned in 2019, releasing the album "The Acoustic Sessions", that featured acoustic versions of older songs and some new ones, including the single "Halo".

Members
Current
Baxter Teal – lead vocals, rhythm guitar
Aron Robinson – drums, percussion
Ken Becker – lead guitar, backing vocals
PJ Farley – bass guitar, backing vocals

Former
Eric Bass – guitar
Russell Lee – drums
J. King – bass guitar, later lead guitar
Dawson Huss
Sean Von Tersch
Brandon Spytma
Daniel Garvin
Jason Chapman

Discography
Studio albums

 Archetypes and Repetition (2007)
 Nothing Can Save Us Now (2011)

Compilations
 The Acoustic Sessions (2019)

References

External links 
Official website

Rock music groups from South Carolina
American nu metal musical groups
American post-grunge musical groups
Musical groups established in 2005
Musical quartets
Heavy metal musical groups from South Carolina